Ass worship may refer to:

Body worship, a submissive act pertaining to BDSM.
Onolatry, the ancient worship of donkeys.

See also 
 Ass (disambiguation)